Seyed Mohammad Shirazi (12 May 1894 – 11 October 1971), commonly known as Sultan al-Wa'izin Shirazi ("Prince of Preachers from Shiraz"), was a prominent Shi'a scholar. He authored Peshawar Nights, an account of a public debate between Shi'a and Sunni Muslims which took place in Peshawar over 10 nights beginning on 27 January 1927 

Sultanu l-Wa'izin Shirazi was born in Tehran on 12 May 1894. After his primary school in Tehran, he moved with his father to Karbala and studied in some Hawzas.

Overview
According to the book, he participated in a public debate between Shi'a Muslims and Sunni Muslims. The debate is said to have taken place in Peshawar (now in Pakistan, which at the time was part of British India) beginning on 27 January 1924. The Shi'a were victorious in debate. According to the preface:
''A condition of the dialogue was that only sources acceptable to both sects would be cited. The dialogue was held in Persian, commonly understood in the city of Peshawar. The transcript, made by four reporters and published in the newspapers daily, was published in book form in Teheran and soon became a classic authority in the East. The present work is based on the fourth edition, published in Teheran in 1971, the year in which Sultan al-Wa'izin died at the age of 75

See also
List of Islamic scholars

References

Iranian ayatollahs
1894 births
1971 deaths
Burials at Fatima Masumeh Shrine